The nyama choma is a specialty of grilled goat meat. Roasted meat is very popular in Kenya where it is considered the national dish also in Tanzania. The expression nyama choma means "barbecue meat" in kiswahili.

Preparation 
In Kenya, goat meat is preferred, but beef is also used.

For the authentic nyama choma, just add salt and pepper, but some people marinate it first in a mixture of onions, garlic and ground ginger, with some hot pepper and lemon juice.

Consumption 
It is available in both roadside greasy spoons and in large restaurants. It is eaten with the fingers.

The side dishes are varied, but the most classic are the salad kachumbari and ugali.

Notes and references

Bibliography 

 Juliana Letara, James MacGregor et Ced Hesse, Estimating the Economic Significance of Pastoralism: The example of the « nyama choma » sector in Tanzania, International Institute for Environment and Development (IIED), Edinburgh, November 2006, 20 p. [lire en ligne].
 Coco Wiseman, « Nyama choma (Kenyan grilled meat) », in African Cookbook: Coco Cooks Kenya, Springwood emedia .

Annexes 
 Braai

Meat dishes
Kenyan cuisine
Tanzanian cuisine